Sulphur Creek is a stream in Lincoln and Pike counties of Missouri. It is a tributary of the North Fork Cuivre River.

Sulphur Creek was so named due to reports of sulphur in area springs.

See also
List of rivers of Missouri

References

Rivers of Lincoln County, Missouri
Rivers of Pike County, Missouri
Rivers of Missouri